In natural language processing, few-shot learning or few-shot prompting is a prompting technique that allows a model to process examples before attempting a task. The method was popularized after the advent of GPT-3 and is considered to be an emergent property of large language models.

A few-shot prompt normally includes n examples of (problem, solution) pairs known as "shots", with the overall usage of such a prompt being known as n-shot prompting. For instance, the following is a one-shot prompt for review sentiment classification: Review: This movie sucks. Sentiment: negative. Review: I love this movie. Sentiment: If the model outputs "positive", then it has correctly solved the task.

The term zero-shot prompting is often used to signify that no examples are provided. An example of a zero-shot prompt for a question-answering task would be "Who wrote the book On the Origin of Species?".

Few-shot learning was initially proposed as an alternative to fine-tuning a pre-trained language model on a task-specific dataset. The main advantages of few-shot learning over fine-tuning are a reduction in the amount of task-specific data needed and a reduced potential of overfitting by learning an overly narrow distribution from a large but narrow fine-tuning dataset. Few-shot performance of large language models has been shown to achieve competitive results on NLP tasks, sometimes surpassing prior state-of-the-art fine-tuning approaches. Examples of such NLP tasks are translation, question answering, cloze tasks, unscrambling words, and using a novel word in a sentence. The creation and optimization of such few-shot prompts is part of the now active field of study of prompt engineering.

While few-shot prompting has performed competitively when compared to fine-tuned models, it has its own drawbacks. For example, it has been shown that the order in which the shots are listed can make the difference between state-of-the-art and random guess performance. A set of few-shot examples that works well in some specific order with one model may not work at all when used with a different model.

A common example of few-shot learning is chain-of-thought prompting, where few-shot examples are given to teach the model to output a string of reasoning before attempting to answer a question. This technique has been shown to improve performance of models in tasks that require logical thinking and reasoning.

See also 
Prompt engineering
Fine-tuning (machine learning)
Chain-of-thought prompting

References 

Natural language processing
Machine learning
Language modeling